ROF, or RoF, may refer to:
 Rate of fire
 Radio over Fiber
 Republic Of Finland 
 Rise of Flight, a World War I air combat simulation game for PCs
 Rollonfriday
 Rossini Opera Festival
 Royal Ordnance Factory
 Rolling on Floor